Kiltera Ogham Stones are two ogham stones forming a National Monument located in County Waterford, Ireland.

Location

Kiltera Ogham Stones is located in a field on the east bank of the Munster Blackwater, 1.8 km (1.1 mi) west of Aglish.

History

Kiltera Ogham Stones were carved in the 6th/7th centuries AD.

Description

The larger stone (CIIC 266) dates from c. AD 500–700 and is slate, with quartz veins and measures 132 × 51 × 13 cm. The inscription reads ᚛ᚉᚑᚂᚂᚐᚁᚑᚈ ᚋᚒᚉᚖ ᚂᚒᚌᚐ ᚋᚐᚊᚔ ᚂᚑᚁᚐᚉᚉᚑᚅᚐ᚜ (COLLABOT MUCOI LUGA MAQI LOBACCONA), "Of Cóelub of the tribe of Lug, son of Lubchú."

The smaller stone (CIIC 267) reads ᚛ᚋᚓᚇᚒᚄᚔ ᚋᚒᚉᚖ ᚂᚒᚌᚐ᚜ (MEDUSI MUCOI LUGA), "Medusi of the tribe of Lug." It measures 130 × 41 × 25 cm.

A third stone (CIIC 268), carved c. AD 540–600, later removed to the National Museum, read ᚛ᚉᚐᚈᚈᚒᚃᚔᚏ᚜ (CATTUVIR).

References

National Monuments in County Waterford
Ogham inscriptions
6th-century inscriptions
7th-century inscriptions